The 2013/14 season of the Azerbaijan Women's Volleyball Super League,   was the sixth annual season of the country's highest volleyball level. Rabita Baku won their sixth consecutive title.

Members of the Azerbaijan Women's Volleyball Super League (2013–14 season)

Note: Table lists in alphabetical order.

|}

Round 1

|}

|}

|}

|}

|}

|}

|}

|}

|}

|}

Round 2

|}

|}

|}

|}

|}

|}

|}

|}

|}

|}

|}

|}

Round 3

|}

|}

|}

|}

|}

|}

|}

Semi-final

|}

|}

3rd place

|}

Final

|}

Awards
MVP:  Aurea Cruz (Rabita Baku)
MVP of Final :  Katarzyna Skowrońska (Rabita Baku)
Best Scorer :  Katarzyna Skowrońska (Rabita Baku)
Best Setter :  Nootsara Tomkom (Rabita Baku)
Best Blocker :  Annerys Vargas (Azeryol Baku)
Best Server :  Manon Flier (Igtisadchi Baku)
Best Spiker :  Pleumjit Thinkaow (Igtisadchi Baku)
Best Receiver :  Aurea Cruz (Rabita Baku)
Best Digger :  Aurea Cruz (Rabita Baku)
Best Libero :  Brenda Castillo (Rabita Baku)

References

External links
 Volleyball in Azerbaijan

Volleyball competitions in Azerbaijan